The women's tournament of field hockey at the 2013 Summer Universiade was held from July 7 to 15 in Kazan, Russia.

Results

Preliminary round

Pool matches

Classification round

Bronze-medal match

Gold-medal match

Statistics

Final standings

Goalscorers

References

Women
Summer Universiade
2013 Summer Universiade